Queendom is a South Korean reality competition television program that aired on Mnet.

The first season aired from August 29 to October 31, 2019, on every Thursday at 21:20 (KST). This season, Mamamoo finished in first place.

The second season, dubbed as Queendom 2, premiered on March 31, 2022 airing in the same time slot. This season, WJSN finished in first place.

Overview
The program is a comeback battle between 6 trending girl group acts, in order to "determine the real number one" when all 6 release their singles at the same time. The winning act will have a comeback show only for them, showing the new song and their other hit songs, arranged however they want it. The comeback show is broadcast on Mnet and M2.

Each season lasted for 10 weeks, Both seasons featured 3 preliminary performances and 1 live comeback stage from each act. The Comeback Singles, which are newly produced songs, of the 6 acts are released a few days prior to the final episode. The digital points accumulated for the Comeback Singles and live votes for the comeback stages on the final episode, together with the accumulated points from the 3 preliminary performances, were the keys to determine the final winner.

The first season's winner was Mamamoo; their comeback show happened on November 3, 2020 as the group made their comeback with their tenth mini album Travel. The comeback show for the second season's winner WJSN will take place on July 5, 2022 as the group makes their comeback with their first special single album Sequence.

Cast

Hosts
 Lee Da-hee – "Queen" MC
 Jang Sung-kyu – "Dom" MC

Contestants
 Park Bom
 AOA
 Mamamoo
 Lovelyz
 Oh My Girl
 (G)I-dle

Hosts
 Taeyeon – "Grandmaster" MC
 Lee Yong-jin – "Queen" Manager

Contestants
 Hyolyn
 Viviz
 Brave Girls
 WJSN
 Loona
 Kep1er

Episodes

For the first season, the overall rankings are calculated out of a maximum of 100,000 points for each act, and distributed based on:
 3 preliminary performances (35,000 points)
 1st preliminary performance – 10,000 points
 2nd preliminary performance – 10,000 points
 3rd preliminary performance – 15,000 points
 Digital points of the Comeback Singles performance (15,000 points)
 Calculated from the time of release till 23:59 (KST) on October 28, 2019.
 Text message votes of the Finale Live Comeback Stages – 50,000 points

For the preliminary performances, if one act gets a 6th place twice in a row, they will be eliminated from the show. This is also named the "Dishonored Step Down".

1st Preliminary Performances – Representative Hit Song (Episode 1–2)
In the first preliminary performances, the six acts each perform one of their hit songs that is rearranged and different from their usual stages of the song. Before the performance, the six acts have ten minutes to arrange their cue sheet, which they must complete within the timing, otherwise they will be deducted 1,000 points. They are also allowed to forcefully rearrange the orders.

For the first preliminary performances, the points breakdown are calculated out of maximum of 10,000 points for each act, and distributed based on:
 Audience Judge Squad – 7,000 points
 Special Judge Squad (consisting of idol trainees who are all direct juniors to the six acts) – 2,000 points
 Assessment from the other Queendom acts – 1,000 points
with the Audience Judge Squad and the Special Judge Squad allowed to vote for two acts. The act that receives the most votes for the Special Judge Award will have all 2,000 points secured to themselves. For the assessment from the other Queendom acts, every act has to vote for an act that they believed to have performed better than them and also to have performed worse than them. A hidden rule is that an act also can choose not to vote (usually) for an act that is better than them.

2nd Preliminary Performances – Cover Song (Episode 3–4)
In the second preliminary performances, the six acts each performs a song from a fellow Queendom act, that is rearranged into a different style. Before the performance, the act that ranked first in the first preliminary performances get the priority to choose an act of their choice and cover of one of their songs in this round, the chosen act will also cover one of the songs from the chooser act. The same process is applied to the acts ranked second to sixth in the first preliminary performances, with the remaining two acts regardless of ranking that are not chosen becoming a pair to cover each other's songs. The act that ranked first in the first preliminary performances also get to arrange their cue sheet for this round. Each act must also perform a Queendom Quest, which are picked randomly, act that successfully completed the Queendom Quest, get one of the following benefits that are picked randomly:
 Watch other acts rehearsal for a day (contestants are usually not allowed to watch the other acts rehearse)
 Free Pass for Special Effects
 Exchange Pass for one-time cue sheet position
 Free Pass for 2nd Preliminary Performances song selection
 Production Crew Chance

For the second preliminary performances, the points breakdown are calculated out of maximum of 10,000 points for each act, and distributed based on:
 Audience Judge Squad – 7,000 points
 Special Judge Squad (consisting of security guards) – 2,000 points
 Assessment from the other Queendom acts – 1,000 points
with the Audience Judge Squad and the Special Judge Squad allowed to vote for two acts. The act that receives the most votes for the Special Judge Award will have all 2,000 points secured to themselves. For the assessment from the other Queendom acts, every act has to vote for an act that they believed to have performed better than them and also to have performed worse than them. A hidden rule is that an act also can choose not to vote (usually) for an act that is better than them.

3rd Preliminary Performances (Part 1) – Unit Round (Episode 7)
In part one of the third preliminary performances, the six acts each send a main vocalist and main dancer, to form a Vocal Unit and a Performance Unit. The vocal units will compete to gain points as a unit, while the performance unit will perform together but will compete for their respective groups' points. Before the performance, besides each act sending a main vocalist and a main dancer to the Queendom Workshop to practise for this round, the rest of the contestants would join the Queendom Workshop as supporters. During the Queendom Workshop, each of the Vocal Units would undergo intermediate check, there after all of the contestants will each vote a Vocal Unit they think would be ranked first in the actual performance. In addition, during the Queendom Workshop, a Queendom Quest between the six acts will be played, with the winning act of the Queendom Quest getting to choose the Special Judge Squad for part two of the third preliminary performances.

For part one of the third preliminary performances, the points breakdown are calculated out of maximum of 5,000 points for each act, and distributed based on:
 Vocal Unit
 1st place – 2,500 points given to the unit's members' respective groups
 2nd place – 1,500 points given to the unit's members' respective groups
 3rd place – 500 points given to the unit's members' respective groups
 Performance Unit
 1st place (member with the most votes) – 2,500 points given to her group
 Remaining members – Points calculated in proportion to the 1st place

The votes breakdown are calculated by the Audience Judge Squad who will each vote for their favorite Vocal Unit and favorite member of the Performance Unit.

Vocal Unit

Performance Unit

Results

3rd Preliminary Performances (Part 2) – Fan-dora's Box (Episode 8–9)
In part two of the third preliminary performances, the six acts will each perform a song suggested by the audience. For part two of the third preliminary performances, the points breakdown are calculated out of maximum of 10,000 points for each act, and distributed based on:
 Audience Judge Squad – 7,000 points
 Special Judge Squad (consisting of housewives from singing club) – 2,000 points
 Assessment from the other Queendom acts – 1,000 points
with the Audience Judge Squad and the Special Judge Squad allowed to vote for two acts. The act that receives the most votes for the Special Judge Award will have all 2,000 points secured to themselves. For the assessment from the other Queendom acts, every act has to vote for an act that they believed to have performed better than them and also to have performed worse than them. A hidden rule is that an act also can choose not to vote (usually) for an act that is better than them.

The votes breakdown are calculated by the Audience Judge Squad who will each vote for their favorite Vocal Unit and favorite member of the Performance Unit.

Results

Finale Live Comeback Stages (Episode 10)
In the finale live comeback stages, the six acts each perform a newly produced song live. Before the performance, the act that ranked first in the third preliminary performances get to arrange their cue sheet for the finale.

For the finale performances, the points breakdown are calculated out of maximum of 50,000 points for each act, and distributed based on votes from the general public through text message, there are not any live audience voting. The act with the most votes get 50,000 points, with the points for the remaining acts calculated in proportion of the number of votes received to the number of votes received by the 1st placed act.

Points Summary
 There were no points breakdown announced for Finale Live Comeback Stage.
 The points for the preliminary performances have been adjusted such that the 1st place act for each preliminary performance gets the full points, and the points of the remaining acts would be calculated in proportion to the 1st place act.

For the second season, the overall ranking are calculated based on:
 3 preliminary performance rounds
 1st preliminary performance round – 10,000 points
 2nd preliminary performance round – 10,000 points
 3rd preliminary performance round – 20,000 points
 View and like counts of performance videos (full-version videos only; data of the first 4 days from upload would be taken) – 5,000 points
 Fan's Choice votes – 5,000 points
 Digital points of the Comeback Singles calculated from the time of release until 23:59 KST on May 30, 2022 – 20,000 points
 Text message votes of the Finale Live Comeback Stages – 30,000 points

For the preliminary performances, if an act ranks 6th place twice, they will be eliminated from the show.

1st Preliminary Performances – Representative Song Battle (Episode 1–2)
In the first preliminary performances, the six acts each performs one of their songs. They may choose how many songs to perform, and are also allowed to perform songs from their previous acts.

For the first preliminary performances, the points breakdown is calculated out of a maximum of 10,000 points for each act, and distributed based on:
 Live audience votes (including rookie idol groups MCND, Woo!ah!, Drippin, Purple Kiss, and Luminous) – 6,000 points
 Global audience votes – 3,000 points
 Assessment from the other Queendom acts – 1,000 points
For the assessment from the other Queendom acts, every act has to vote for an act that they believed to have performed better than them and also to have performed worse than them. A hidden rule is that an act also can choose not to vote (usually) for an act that is better than them. The 1st placed act gets the full 10,000 points, with each of the remaining acts getting points based on the proportions of the points obtained compared to the points obtained for the 1st placed act.

2nd Preliminary Performances – Cover Song Battle (Episode 3–4)
In the second preliminary performances, the six acts each performs a song from a fellow Queendom act that is rearranged into a different style.

For the second preliminary performances, the points breakdown is calculated out of a maximum of 10,000 points for each act, and distributed based on:
 Live audience votes (including groups AOA, (G)I-dle, The Boyz, Pentagon, Oneus, and TO1) – 6,000 points
 Global audience votes – 3,000 points
 Assessment from the other Queendom acts – 1,000 points
For the assessment from the other Queendom acts, every act has to vote for an act that they believed to have performed better than them and also to have performed worse than them. A hidden rule is that an act also can choose not to vote (usually) for an act that is better than them. The 1st placed act gets the full 10,000 points, with each of the remaining acts getting points based on the proportions of the points obtained compared to the points obtained for the 1st placed act.

3rd Preliminary Performances (Part 1) – Position Unit Battle (Episode 6–7)
In part one of the third preliminary performances, the six acts are split into Vocal and Dance Units; each of the units work together to create a performance specific to the unit's type.

The maximum points an act can obtain is 5,000 points; 2,500 points maximum vocal and dance units each which are distributed based on:
 1st place – 2,500 points given to the unit's members' respective groups
 2nd place – 1,500 points given to the unit's members' respective groups
 3rd place – 500 points given to the unit's members' respective groups

Vocal Units

Dance Units

Results

3rd Preliminary Performances (Part 2) – FANtastic Queendom (Episode 8–9)
In part two of the third preliminary performances, the six acts will each perform a song suggested by the audience.

The maximum points an act can obtain is 15,000 points which are distributed based on:
 Live audience votes – 9,000 points
 Global audience votes – 5,000 points
 Assessment from other Queendom acts – 1,000 points
For the assessment from the other Queendom acts, every act has to vote for an act that they believed to have performed better than them and also to have performed worse than them. A hidden rule is that an act also can choose not to vote (usually) for an act that is better than them. The 1st placed act gets the full 15,000 points, with each of the remaining acts getting points based on the proportions of the points obtained compared to the points obtained for the 1st placed act.

Results

Finale Live Comeback Stages (Episode 10)
In the finale live comeback stages, the six acts each perform a newly produced song live. The maximum points an act can obtain is 20,000 points.

Points Summary

Discography

Cover Song Performances Part 1

Cover Song Performances Part 2

Fan-dora's Box Part 1

Fan-dora's Box Part 2

Finale Comeback Singles

Chart performance

Part 1-1

Notes
 "Interlude: Who is the Queen" is stylized in all caps.
 "Time For the Glory" is a combination of GFriend's "Time for the Moon Night" and "Rough".

Part 1-2

Notes
 "Wa Da Da" is stylized in all caps.

Part 2-1

Notes
 All tracks are stylized in all caps.
 All tracks are cover versions with "Navillera" originally sung by GFriend, "Shake It" originally sung by Sistar, and "MVSK" originally sung by Kep1er.

Part 2-2

Notes
 "Unnatural" is stylized in all caps.
 "Pool Party (Rollin' right now)" is a remix of Brave Girls's "Pool Party" and "Rollin'".
 All tracks are cover versions with "Unnatural" originally sung by WJSN, "Pool Party" originally sung by Brave Girls, and "So What" originally sung by Loona.

Position Unit Battle Part 1-1

Notes
 "Don't Go" is a cover version originally sung by Exo.

Position Unit Battle Part 1-2

Notes
 "Ka-Boom!" is stylized in all caps.

Fantastic Queendom Part 1-1

Notes
 "Bop Bop!" is stylized in all caps.

Fantastic Queendom Part 1-2

Notes
 "See Sea, Bae" is a combination of Hyolyn's "See Sea" and "Bae".

Final

Notes
 "Aura", "The Girls", and "Pose" are stylized in all caps.

Special Song (Epilogue)

Chart performance

Ratings

Spin-off

On March 5, 2020, Mnet confirmed that Road to Kingdom would begin filming in the middle of March, with the lineup to be confirmed. It was confirmed to be aired beginning at the end of April, with the show being hosted again by Lee Da-hee and Jang Sung-kyu. On March 20, Mnet confirmed the show's lineup would consist of Pentagon, ONF, Golden Child, The Boyz, Verivery, Oneus and TOO. The show began airing from April 30 and ended on June 18.

Kingdom: Legendary War, aired from April 1, 2021, and ended on June 3, 2021.

On January 26, 2023, Mnet announced a spin-off of the series titled Queendom Puzzle, scheduled to premiere in the first half of 2023.

Notes

References

External links 
  
  
 

2019 South Korean television series debuts
2019 South Korean television series endings
Korean-language television shows
Music competitions in South Korea
South Korean reality television series
South Korean music television shows
South Korean variety television shows
Mnet (TV channel) original programming
Reality music competition television series
K-pop television series